The 2016 New Hampshire gubernatorial election took place on November 8, 2016, to elect the governor of New Hampshire, concurrently with the 2016 U.S. presidential election, as well as elections to the United States Senate, elections to the United States House of Representatives and various state and local elections.

The primaries were held on September 13.

Incumbent Democratic Governor Maggie Hassan was eligible to run for re-election to a third term in office, but she instead successfully ran for the U.S. Senate against incumbent Kelly Ayotte. In the general election, Republican nominee Chris Sununu defeated Democrat Colin Van Ostern and Libertarian state representative Max Abramson to become the first Republican governor of New Hampshire elected since 2002. With a margin of 2.27%, this election was the second-closest race of the 2016 gubernatorial election cycle, behind only the election in North Carolina.

Background
Governor Maggie Hassan, the incumbent from the Democratic Party, declined to run for reelection, choosing to seek a U.S. Senate seat instead. Both major parties had multiple declared candidates, leading to primary elections that were held September 13, 2016.

New Hampshire and Vermont are the only states in the country whose governors are elected every two years.

Democratic primary

Candidates

Declared
 Mark Connolly, former New Hampshire Deputy Secretary of State
 Derek Dextraze
 Ian Freeman, radio host
 Steve Marchand, former mayor of Portsmouth
 Colin Van Ostern, Executive Councilor

Declined
 Jackie Cilley, state representative, former state senator and candidate for governor in 2012
 Dan Feltes, state senator
 Maggie Hassan, incumbent governor (running for U.S. Senate)
 Andrew Hosmer, state senator
 Ann McLane Kuster, U.S. Representative (running for re-election)
 Shawn O'Connor, businessman (running for NH-01)
 Chris Pappas, Executive Councilor
 Stefany Shaheen, Portsmouth City Councilor and daughter of U.S. Senator Jeanne Shaheen
 Carol Shea-Porter, former U.S. Representative (running for NH-01)
 Donna Soucy, state senator
 Mike Vlacich, campaign manager for Senator Shaheen

Polling

Results

Republican primary

Candidates

Declared
 Frank Edelblut, state representative
 Jeanie Forrester, state senator
 Ted Gatsas, Mayor of Manchester
 John Lavoie
 Chris Sununu, Executive Councilor, son of former governor John H. Sununu and brother of former U.S. Senator John E. Sununu

Declined
 Jeb Bradley, Majority Leader of the State Senate and former U.S. Representative
 Walt Havenstein, businessman and nominee for governor in 2014
 Donnalee Lozeau, Mayor of Nashua
 Chuck Morse, president of the State Senate
 Andy Sanborn, state senator

Endorsements

Polling

Results

Libertarian Party

Candidates

Declared

 Max Abramson, state representative

Independents

Candidates

Declared

 Mike Gill, businessman
 Jilletta Jarvis, training project manager

General election

Debates
Complete video of debate, October 26, 2016 - C-SPAN

Predictions

Polling
Aggregate polls

with Maggie Hassan

with Stefany Shaheen

with Chris Pappas

with Terie Norelli

with Mark Connolly

with Jackie Cilley

Results

Results by county

Notes

References

External links
Chris Sununu (R) for Governor
Colin Van Ostern (D) for Governor
Max Abramson (L) for Governor
Jilletta Jarvis (I) for Governor

New Hampshire
Governor
2016